Anna Sten  (born Anna Petrivna Fesak, December 3, 1908November 12, 1993) was a Ukrainian-born American actress. She began her career in stage plays and films in the Soviet Union before traveling to Germany, where she starred in several films. Her performances were noticed by film producer Samuel Goldwyn, who brought her to the United States with the aim of creating a new screen personality to rival Greta Garbo. After a few unsuccessful films, Goldwyn released her from her contract. She continued to act occasionally until her final film appearance in 1962.

Early life and education
Sten was born December 3, 1908, in Kiev, then part of the Russian Empire. There are other conflicting dates of birth: 1910 and 1906 from self-written dates in application forms from college. Her mother, Alexandra, listed Anna's birthdate as October 29, 1906, upon her arrival in the United States, although some of the discrepancies may be owing from the switch from the Julian calendar (still used in the Russian Empire up to 1918) to the Gregorian calendar. According to the official biography, her father was born into a Cossack family, worked as a theater artist and producer. Her mother was a Swede by birth and was a ballerina. In Kiev in the middle of the 1920s she married entertainer and variety actor Boris Sten (né Bernstein), and took his stage name as her own.

In most foreign sources her maiden names are Stenska and Sudakevich, or a combination thereof (such as a common variant Anel (Anyushka) Stenska-Sudakevich or Annel (Anjuschka) Stenskaja Sudakewitsch), which is why Sten has been mistakenly identified with the Russian actress Anel Sudakevich, who starred in Soviet cinema at the same time and with some of the same directors as Anna Sten. The actresses have often been confused for one another.

Sten received her education at Kyiv State Theatre College, worked as a reporter and simultaneously played in Kyiv Maly Theater, attended classes at the studio theater where she worked within the Stanislavsky System. In 1926, she successfully passed her exams in the first working Proletcult theater in Moscow.

Career
In 1926, after completing her studies at Kiev theater school, Sten was invited by Ukrainian film director Viktor Turin to appear in his film Provokator, based on the book by Ukrainian writer Oles Dosvitnyi. Sten was discovered by the Russian stage director and instructor Konstantin Stanislavsky, who arranged an audition for her at the Moscow Film Academy. Sten went on to act in other plays and films in Ukraine and Russia, including Boris Barnet's comedy The Girl with a Hatbox (1927). She and her husband, Russian film director Fedor Ozep, traveled to Germany to appear in a film co-produced by German and Soviet studios, The Yellow Ticket (1928). After the film was completed, Anna Sten and her husband decided not to return to the Soviet Union. 

Making a smooth transition to talking pictures, Sten appeared in such German films as Salto Mortale (1931) and The Murderer Dimitri Karamazov (1931) until she came to the attention of American movie mogul Samuel Goldwyn. Goldwyn was looking for a foreign-born actress that he could build up as a rival to Greta Garbo, and possible successor to Vilma Bánky, with whom Goldwyn had great success in the silent era. For two years after bringing Sten to America, Goldwyn had his new star tutored in English and taught Hollywood screen acting methods. He poured a great deal of time and money into Sten's first American film, Nana (1934), a somewhat homogenized version of Émile Zola's scandalous 19th century novel. But the film was not successful at the box office, nor were her two subsequent Goldwyn films, We Live Again (1934) and The Wedding Night (1935), playing opposite Gary Cooper. Reluctantly, Goldwyn dissolved his contract with his "new Garbo". Goldwyn's tutoring of Sten is mentioned in Cole Porter's 1934 song "Anything Goes" from the musical of the same name: "When Sam Goldwyn can with great conviction / Instruct Anna Sten in diction / Then Anna shows / Anything goes."

In the 1940s, Sten appeared in several films, including The Man I Married (1940), So Ends Our Night (1941), Chetniks! The Fighting Guerrillas (1943), They Came to Blow Up America (1943), Three Russian Girls (1943), and Let's Live a Little (1948). Sten continued making films in the United States and England, but none of them were successful. Attempting to rectify this situation by studying at The Actors Studio, Sten appeared in several television series during the 1950s, including The Red Skelton Show (1956), The Walter Winchell File (1957), and Adventures in Paradise (1959).

Later life
Most of Sten's later film appearances were favors to her husband. She had an uncredited bit in the Frenke-produced Heaven Knows, Mr. Allison (1957), and a full lead in her final film (also produced by Frenke), The Nun and the Sergeant (1962).

Sten died on November 12, 1993, in New York City at the age of 84.

Personal life
Sten was married to film producer Eugene Frenke, who flourished in Hollywood after following his wife there in 1932. 
Anna Sten had a daughter Anya Sten who was a student at the Monticello School in Los Angeles in the early 1930s.

Complete filmography

See also

 Alla Nazimova
 Käthe von Nagy
 Igor Ilyinsky
 Ivan Mozzhukhin
 Ossip Runitsch
 Vera Kholodnaya

References
Notes

Citations

External links

 
 
 Photographs and literature
 Anna Sten Biography (in Russian)
 "Anna Sten is not Russian", Ukrainian Weekly 1934/ No.17, p.3
 "Is Anna Sten a Ukrainian?", Ukrainian Weekly 1937/ No.52, p.4

1908 births
1993 deaths
Actors from Kyiv
People from Kiev Governorate
Actresses from the Russian Empire
Russian Christians
Soviet emigrants to the United States
Russian silent film actresses
20th-century Russian actresses
20th-century American actresses